Robert Michael Urich (December 19, 1946 – April 16, 2002) was an American film, television, and stage actor, and television producer. Over the course of his 30-year career, he starred in a record 15 television series.

Urich began his career in television in the early 1970s. After guest stints and roles in short-lived television series, he won a co-starring role in the action/crime drama series S.W.A.T. in 1975. In 1978, he landed the lead role of Dan Tanna in the crime drama series Vega$, which aired on ABC from 1978 to June 1981, and earned him two Golden Globe Award nominations. In addition to his work in television, Urich also co starred in several feature films, including Magnum Force (1973), The Ice Pirates (1984) and Turk 182 (1985). From 1985 to 1988, he portrayed the title role in the detective television series Spenser: For Hire, based on Robert B. Parker's series of mystery novels. In 1988, he began hosting the documentary series National Geographic Explorer. He won a CableACE Award for his work on the series. He was also awarded a Golden Boot Award for his work in Western television series and films.

In 1996, Urich starred in The Lazarus Man. It was canceled shortly after he announced that he had been diagnosed with synovial sarcoma, a rare cancer, in July that year. He sought treatment for his illness while continuing his career and also worked to raise money for cancer research. He was declared cancer free in 1998 and returned to television in the UPN series, Love Boat: The Next Wave. In 2000, he made his Broadway debut as Billy Flynn in the musical Chicago. His last role was in the NBC sitcom Emeril in 2001, but in the autumn of that year, his cancer returned and he died in April 2002 at age 55.

Early life
Urich was born and raised in Toronto, Ohio, the son of John Paul and Cecilia Monica (née Halpate) Urich. He was of Rusyn and Slovak extraction and raised Byzantine Catholic and Roman Catholic. An excellent high school athlete, Urich attended Florida State University on a football scholarship. He played backup center during the 1965–66 football season, receiving only minimal playing time, and was a member of the Lambda Chi Alpha fraternity. In 1968, he earned a bachelor's degree in Radio and Television Communications. He went on to Michigan State University and earned a master's degree in Broadcast Research and Management. Urich then worked as a salesman in Chicago at WGN-TV. He later worked as a weatherman.

Career
After appearing in a Chicago production of The Rainmaker with Burt Reynolds, Urich decided to pursue acting full-time after Reynolds encouraged him to move to Los Angeles, and do more acting.

1970s–1980s

Urich made his television debut in a guest starring role in The F.B.I., in 1972. The following year, he won a lead role in Bob & Carol & Ted & Alice. It was a television adaptation of the 1969 film of the same title. It struggled in the ratings and was canceled after six episodes. He made his film debut later that same year opposite Clint Eastwood in the Dirty Harry film Magnum Force playing a vigilante motorcycle-patrol police officer. In 1975, Urich was cast in the action/crime drama series S.W.A.T.. According to the executive producer Aaron Spelling, Burt Reynolds convinced Spelling to allow Urich to read for the part. Spelling was impressed with his reading and cast him in the role of "Officer Jim Street". A mid-season replacement, it earned high enough ratings to warrant a second season. However, it was canceled in 1976 due to its violent content.

Urich's next role was on the sitcom Soap as Peter the Tennis Player in 1977. That same year he was cast as Paul Thurston, a handsome, ego-driven talk show host in the Bewitched spin-off series Tabitha, starring Lisa Hartman. Its ratings were initially strong, but schedule changes caused ratings to drop, and the show was canceled in 1978 after 13 episodes. Shortly after, he was cast in another Aaron Spelling produced series, called Vega$. Urich portrayed the series' lead character, Dan Tanna, a private detective who solves various crimes in Las Vegas. Vega$ was a hit for ABC and he received two Golden Globe Award nominations for his work on it. By the third season, ratings had started to decline, and with little network support, Vega$ was canceled at the end of the third season in June, 1981. Shortly after, Urich signed with Metro-Goldwyn-Mayer (MGM) and focused on film roles. His first film for MGM was Endangered Species (1982), a science fiction film directed by Alan Rudolph.

After filming Endangered Species, Urich returned to television and started in Gavilan. He played the title character who was a former CIA agent turned oceanographer. The series, however, was canceled after seven episodes. In 1984, he starred in two more films The Ice Pirates, and Wes Craven's Invitation to Hell. In 1985, Urich co-starred in the film Turk 182, although it was not a commercial success. In 1985, Urich returned to episodic television as the title character in Spenser: For Hire. It was a hit and aired for three seasons. He also reprised the role in several television films after it was canceled: Spenser: Ceremony (1993), Spenser: Pale Kings and Princes (1994), Spenser: The Judas Goat (1994), and Spenser: A Savage Place (1995). In 1988, he hosted the documentary series National Geographic Explorer. He won a CableACE Award for his work on the series. In 1989, he portrayed Jake Spoon in the acclaimed television miniseries Lonesome Dove, a role for which he received many positive reviews.

1990s–2000s
In the 1990s, Urich mainly appeared in television films and several short-lived television series. From 1990 to 1991, he starred in the sitcom American Dreamer and the TV movie 83 Hours 'Til Dawn. The following year, he starred in Crossroads, a drama series that aired on ABC for ten episodes. In 1993, he and Faye Dunaway starred in the sitcom It Had to Be You. It was critically panned and canceled after four episodes. In 1995, he narrated an extremely rare one-night showing of a Disney television documentary called Alien Encounters: From New Tomorrowland. It has never been shown again. In 1996, he starred in the TNT western series The Lazarus Man. It earned strong enough ratings to be picked up for a second season but shortly after it was renewed, he announced he had been diagnosed with synovial sarcoma. Its production company, Castle Rock Entertainment, opted to cancel it due to that. In 1999, he commented on their choice to do so, "There's really a law against what they did. They found out I had cancer, and they just canceled the show. They didn't ask the doctors if I could work. They didn't ask if I could go back to work." In 2000, he sued them for breach of contract. The lawsuit was later settled with both parties agreeing not to publicly disclose the terms. While undergoing cancer treatments, Urich hosted the medical documentary series Vital Signs in 1997 and the PBS series Boatworks. After a year of treatment, he was declared cancer-free and returned to television in 1998 as Captain Jim Kennedy III in Love Boat: The Next Wave. It aired on UPN for two seasons. In 2000, he made his Broadway debut as Billy Flynn in the musical Chicago and also starred in the North American tour of the musical, in 1999 and in 2000. The next year, he costarred in Emeril, a sitcom starring celebrity chef Emeril Lagasse. While it was critically panned, he received good notices for his work on it. It would be his last role in a television series. Urich's final television film, Night of the Wolf, aired on Animal Planet the night before his death.

Personal life

Marriages and children
Urich's first marriage was to actress Barbara Rucker in 1968. They divorced in 1974. He married actress Heather Menzies (1949–2017) in 1975. They adopted three children, Ryan, Emily, and Allison. They remained married until his death in 2002.

Illness and death
In July 1996, Urich announced he had been diagnosed with synovial sarcoma, a rare form of cancer that attacks soft tissue. He continued working while undergoing treatment for his illness and also became an advocate for finding a cure for cancer. He won an award from the John Wayne Cancer Institute and the Gilda Radner Courage Award for his work raising cancer awareness. He and Menzies-Urich also founded the Urich Fund for the University of Michigan Comprehensive Cancer Center to raise funds for cancer research. He also donated the $125,000 he won when he appeared on an episode of Who Wants to Be a Millionaire. He was declared cancer free in 1998. That same year, he was named the national spokesperson for the American Cancer Society.

In November 2001, Urich revealed in an interview that his doctors had discovered lumps in his body but "a wonder drug had cleared them up". The week before his death, he was hospitalized at Los Robles Hospital & Medical Center in Thousand Oaks for breathing problems. He died there on April 16, 2002. His Funeral Mass was offered on April 19 at St. Charles Borromeo Church in North Hollywood.

He was cremated and his ashes were buried on the grounds of his family's vacation home in Prince Edward County, Ontario, Canada. A monument was placed in the West Lake Church of Christ Cemetery, which is located near the family's vacation home.

Legacy
Before his death, Urich and Menzies-Urich helped to raise money for the Eccles Performing Arts Centers at the Park City High School in Park City, Utah. After his death, the school established the Robert Urich Scholarship fund in his honor. In addition, Urich and Menzies-Urich established the Robert and Heather Urich Fund for Sarcoma Research at the University of Michigan Comprehensive Cancer Center. She also had cancer and was an ovarian cancer survivor. Menzies-Urich continued to work for the center, and died from brain cancer on Christmas Eve, December 24, 2017, surrounded by their three children.

Urich's hometown of Toronto, Ohio, named the Robert Urich Interchange in his honor. It connects the town to Ohio State Route 7. For his contribution to the television industry, Urich has a star on the Hollywood Walk of Fame located at 7083 Hollywood Blvd.  Until Usher was added, he was the only person with a name starting with the letter U on the walk.

Filmography

See also

References

External links
 Robert Urich, (1946-2002) - The Carpathian Connection
 
 
 

1946 births
2002 deaths
People from Toronto, Ohio
20th-century American male actors
21st-century American male actors
American male film actors
American people of Rusyn descent
American people of Slovak descent
American male stage actors
American male television actors
American television personalities
Television producers from Ohio
Deaths from cancer in California
Neurological disease deaths in California
Deaths from synovial sarcoma
Florida State University alumni
Florida State Seminoles football players
Michigan State University alumni
Male Western (genre) film actors